The Communauté de communes CAPAVENIR is a French former administrative association of communes in the Vosges département of eastern France and in the region of Lorraine. It was created in December 2004 and had its administrative offices at Thaon-les-Vosges. It was merged into the new Communauté d'agglomération d'Épinal in January 2013.

The name
Most French commune groupings of this type are named after the region in which they are located or after the largest town (usually also the administrative centre) in the territory.   Capavenir is, however, an aspirational (and almost untranslatable) descriptive name evoking the future ("l'avenir") as a destination. The name is sometimes written in upper case letters as CAPAVENIR.

Composition
The Communauté de communes comprised the following communes:

 Chavelot
 Frizon
 Gigney
 Girmont
 Mazeley
 Nomexy
 Oncourt
 Thaon-les-Vosges

References

Capavenir